John Thomas Deering (June 25, 1879 – February 15, 1943) was a Major League Baseball pitcher who played in  with the Detroit Tigers and the New York Highlanders. He batted and threw right-handed.

He was born in Lynn, Massachusetts, and died in Beverly, Massachusetts.

External links

1879 births
1943 deaths
Major League Baseball pitchers
Baseball players from Massachusetts
Detroit Tigers players
New York Highlanders players
Schenectady Electricians players
Derby Angels players
New London Whalers players
New Haven Blues players
Toledo Mud Hens players
Norwich Reds players
Montreal Royals players
Lynn Shoemakers players